Steve Colman is an American award-winning poet, playwright, producer, and director.

Biography

Colman was the inaugural poet on the Peabody Award-winning television series Russell Simmons presents Def Poetry Jam on HBO. He co-wrote and co-starred in the Tony Award-winning Def Poetry Jam on Broadway."Pogrebin, Robin (April 18, 2003) "A Rainbow of Poets Who Rhyme From Life". New York Times.  Colman co-conceived and assistant directed Sarah Jones’s 2006 Tony Award-winning show Bridge and Tunnel, which was originally produced Off-Broadway by Meryl Streep.  
His theater work, including his collaborations with Jones, have garnered two Drama Desk nominations, an Obie, and a Theater World Award.  Colman co-authored Burning Down the House (SoftSkull Press), and Russell Simmons' Def Poetry Jam on Broadway and More (Atria Books).

Works
 Colman, Stephen; Procope, Lynne, Bonair-Agard, Gonzalez, Guy; Olson, Alix.  Burning Down The House.  New York: Soft Skull Press, 1998.
 Simmons, Danny.  Russell Simmons Def Poetry Jam on Broadway...and More''.  New York: Atria Books, 2003.

References

External links 

Living people
American dramatists and playwrights
Year of birth missing (living people)
American theatre directors
Place of birth missing (living people)